Steven C. Walker is an American diplomat who is a career member of the Senior Foreign Service, class of Minister-Counselor and has been Chargé d’Affaires at the Embassy in Asmara, Eritrea, since December 2019.  He has also served as Consul General in Basrah, Iraq.

Walker was born and raised in Hawaii and graduated with a bachelor’s degree from Reed College, a master’s degree in international relations from The Fletcher School of Law and Diplomacy, and the National War College, with a master’s degree in national security strategy.

References

Ambassadors of the United States to Eritrea
Reed College alumni
The Fletcher School at Tufts University alumni
Year of birth missing (living people)
National War College alumni
Living people
21st-century American diplomats